Conus bahamensis is a species of sea snail, a marine gastropod mollusk in the family Conidae, the cone snails, cone shells or cones.

These snails are predatory and venomous. They are capable of "stinging" humans.

Description
The size of the shell reaches 31 mm.

Distribution
This marine species of cone snail occurs in the Caribbean Sea.

References

 Vink, D. L. N. and D. Röckel. 1995. Conus bahamensis n. sp., a name for an elusive cone. Apex 10: 99-101.
 Tucker J.K. & Tenorio M.J. (2013) Illustrated catalog of the living cone shells. 517 pp. Wellington, Florida: MdM Publishing.
 Puillandre N., Duda T.F., Meyer C., Olivera B.M. & Bouchet P. (2015). One, four or 100 genera? A new classification of the cone snails. Journal of Molluscan Studies. 81: 1-23

External links
 To World Register of Marine Species
 Cone Shells - Knights of the Sea
 

bahamensis
Gastropods described in 1995